Some numbers are believed by some to be auspicious or lucky (吉利) or inauspicious or unlucky (不吉) based on the Chinese word that the number sounds similar to. The numbers 2, 3, 6, and 8 are generally considered to be lucky, while 4 is considered unlucky. These traditions are not unique to Chinese culture, with other countries with a history of Han characters also having similar beliefs stemming from these concepts.

Zero
The number 0 (零) is the beginning of all things and is generally considered a good number, because it sounds like 良 (pinyin: liáng), which means 'good'.

One
The number 1 (一) is neither auspicious nor inauspicious. It is a number given to winners to indicate the first place. But it can also symbolize loneliness or being single. For example: November 11 is the Singles' Day in China, as the date has four ‘1’ which stand for singles.

Two
The number 2 (二, cardinal,  or 兩, used with units) is most often considered a good number in Chinese culture. In Cantonese, 2 (二 or 兩) is homophonous with the characters for "easy" (易) and "bright" (亮), respectively. There is a Chinese saying: "good things come in pairs". It is common to repeat characters in product brand names, such as the character 喜, can be repeated to form the character 囍. 
 24 in Cantonese sounds like "easy die" (易死).
 28 in Cantonese sounds like "easy prosper" (易發).

Three
The number 3 (三) sounds like 生, which means "to live" or "life" so it's considered a good number. It's significant since it is one of three important stages in a person's life (birth, marriage, and death).On the other hand, number 3 (三,) sounds like 散 which means "to split" or "to separate" or "to part ways" or "to break up with" so it is a bad number too.

Four 

The number 4 (四) is considered an unlucky number in Chinese because it is nearly homophonous to the word "death" (死 ).
Thus, some buildings in East Asia omit floors and room numbers containing 4, similar to the Western practice of some buildings not having a 13th floor because 13 is considered unlucky. 
Where East Asian and Western cultures blend, such as in Hong Kong, it is possible in some buildings that the thirteenth floor along with all the floors with 4s to be omitted. Thus a building whose top floor is numbered 100 would in fact have just eighty one floors. Similarly in Vietnamese, the number 4 (四) is called tứ in Sino-Vietnamese, which sounds like tử (死) (death) in Vietnamese.

Five
The number 5 (五) sounds like "me" in Mandarin (吾) and Cantonese (唔). 
 53 sounds like "my life" in Mandarin (吾生) and Cantonese (唔生).
 54 sounds like "my death" in Mandarin (吾死) and Cantonese (唔死).
 58 sounds like "me prosper" in Mandarin (吾發) and Cantonese (唔發). nb. in Cantonese this combination may also be seen as an inauspicious number as it can mean no prosperity.  (沒發)
Five is also associated with the five elements (Water, Fire, Earth, Wood, and Metal) in Chinese philosophy, and in turn was historically associated with the Emperor of China. For example, the Tiananmen gate, being the main thoroughfare to the Forbidden City, has five arches.

Six
The number 6 (六) in Mandarin sounds like "slick" or "smooth" (溜). In Cantonese, 6 sounds like "good fortune" or "happiness" (祿, 樂 ).
Therefore 6 is considered a good number for business.

Seven
The number 7 (七) in Mandarin sounds like "even" in Mandarin (齊), so it is a good number for relationships. It also sounds like "arise" (起) and "life essence" (氣) in Mandarin.
Seven can also be considered an unlucky number since the 7th month (July) is a "ghost month". It also sounds like "to deceive" (欺) in Mandarin.
In Cantonese, 7 sounds like 𨳍, which is a vulgar way of saying "penis".

Eight
The number 8 (八) sounds like "發".
There is also a visual resemblance between 88 and 囍, a popular decorative design composed of two stylized characters 喜.

The number 8 is viewed as such an auspicious number that even being assigned a number with several eights is considered very lucky.
 In 2014, the Australian Department of Home Affairs renamed their previous Business Skills (provisional) visas, subclasses 160–165, to 188 and 888 Subclasses, both of which include eights. 
 In 2003, the phone number "+86 28 8888 8888" was sold to Sichuan Airlines for CN¥2.33 million (approximately US$280,000). 
 The opening ceremony of the 2008 Summer Olympics in Beijing began on 8/8/08 at 8 minutes and 8 seconds past  local time (UTC+08).
 China, Taiwan, Hong Kong, Macau, Malaysia, the Philippines and Singapore use the time zone UTC+08:00.
 The Asian American mass media company 88rising (known primarily for being the record label of artists such as Joji and Rich Brian) adopted the name in 2016, and has referenced its symbolism in the titles of several events, including the 2018 US tour 88rising Double Happiness.
 The Petronas Twin Towers in Malaysia each have 88 floors.
 Buick offers a minivan for the Chinese market under the GL8 name, a model name not used in any other market.
 The Air Canada route from Shanghai to Toronto is Flight AC88.
 The KLM route from Hong Kong to Amsterdam is Flight KL888.
 The Etihad Airways route from Abu Dhabi to Beijing then onwards to Nagoya is Flight EY888.
 The United Airlines route from Beijing to San Francisco is Flight UA888, the route from Beijing to Newark is Flight UA88, and the route from Chengdu to San Francisco is Flight UA8.
 The Air Astana route from Beijing to Almaty is Flight KC888.
 The British Airways route from Chengdu to London is Flight BA88.
 One of Cathay Pacific's flight numbers from Hong Kong to Vancouver and New York is CX888.
 Singapore Airlines reserves flight numbers beginning with the number 8 for flights to Mainland China, Hong Kong (except SQ1/2 to and from San Francisco via Hong Kong) and Taiwan (i.e. a typical flight between Singapore and Hong Kong would be numbered SQ856/861).
 SriLankan Airlines reserves flight numbers beginning with the number 8 for flights to Mainland China and Hong Kong.
 The Turkish Airlines route from Istanbul to Beijing is TK88.
 The US Treasury has sold 70,000 dollar bills with serial numbers that contain 4 eights.
 Boeing delivered the 8,888th 737 to come off the production line to Xiamen Airlines. The airplane, a Next-Generation 737–800, features a special livery commemorating the airplane's significance.
 In Singapore, a breeder of rare Dragon fish (Asian Arowana, which are "lucky fish" and being a rare species, are required to be microchipped), makes sure to use numbers with plenty of eights in their microchip tag numbers, and appears to reserve particular numbers especially rich in eights and sixes (e.g., 702088880006688) for particularly valuable specimens.
 As part of grand opening promotions, a Commerce Bank branch in New York's Chinatown raffled off safety deposit box No. 888.
 An "auspicious" numbering system was adopted by the developers of 39 Conduit Road Hong Kong, where the top floor was "88" – Chinese for double fortune. It is already common in Hong Kong for ~4th floors not to exist; there is no requirement by the Buildings Department for numbering other than that it being "made in a logical order." A total of 43 intermediate floor numbers are omitted from 39 Conduit Road: those missing include 14, 24, 34, 54, 64, all floors between 40 and 49; the floor number which follows 68 is 88.
 Similar to the common Western practice of using "9" for price points, it is common to see "8" being used in its place to achieve the same psychological effect. So for example menu prices like $58, $88 are frequently seen.

Nine
The number 9 (九) was historically associated with the Emperor of China, and the number was frequently used in matters relating to the Emperor, before the establishment of the imperial examinations officials were organized in the nine-rank system, the nine bestowments were rewards the Emperor made for officials of extraordinary capacity and loyalty, while the nine familial exterminations was one of the harshest punishments the Emperor sentenced; the Emperor's robes often had nine dragons, and Chinese mythology held that the dragon has nine children.
Also, the number 9 sounds like "long lasting" (久), so it is often used in weddings.

In Cantonese, the number 9 is also a vulgar way of saying penis  (𨳊), similar to 7 as well, with 9 referring to an erect penis instead.

Combinations
 514 in Mandarin sounds like "我要死".
 167 in Cantonese sounds like "一碌𨳍", which is a vulgar way of saying "a dick".
 168 sounds like "一路发" meaning "fortune all the way".
 5354 in Cantonese sounds like "唔生唔死" meaning "not alive not dead", referring to being in a miserable state like one is almost dead.
 7456 in Mandarin sounds like "气死我了" meaning "to make me angry" or "to piss me off".
 9413 sounds like "九死一生" meaning 90% chance of being dead and only 10% chance of being alive, or survived such situations (a narrow escape).
 1314 sounds like "一生一世" meaning "forever" and is often used romantically.
 520 in Mandarin sounds similar to "我愛你".
 5201314 in Mandarin sounds like "我愛你一生一世".
 48: Any 3 digit numbers that ends with 48 sounds like "wealthy for X lifetimes", for example, 748 sounds like "七世發" meaning "wealthy for 7 lifetimes". 
 448 sounds like "死先發" meaning "wealthy on death". 
 548 in Cantonese sounds like "唔洗發"() meaning "no need to be wealthy".
 748 in Mandarin sounds like "去死吧".
 518 in Mandarin sounds like "我要发" which means "I am going to prosper".
 7414 in Mandarin is like "go to die"

See also
 Bagua
 Chinese mathematics
 Chinese number gestures
 Chinese numerals
 Color in Chinese culture
 Culture of China
 King Wen sequence
 Numerology
 Homophonic puns in Mandarin Chinese
Faux pas derived from Chinese pronunciation

References

External links 
 Numbers game in China
 Craving lucky numbers in daily life
  Number four not so deadly for Chinese

 Lucky numbers and role in Chinese practice of gift giving between business partners

 Learning Chinese number with gestures
 

Chinese culture
Language games
Numerology
Homonymy in Chinese